The 1972 Kansas State Wildcats football team represented Kansas State University in the 1972 NCAA University Division football season.  The team's head football coach was Vince Gibson.  The Wildcats played their home games in KSU Stadium.

Schedule

Roster

References

Kansas State
Kansas State Wildcats football seasons
Kansas State Wildcats football